The twentieth season of the American police procedural television series NCIS premiered on September 19, 2022 on CBS during the 2022–23 television season, and it will consists of 22 episodes. This is the first season to not credit Mark Harmon who portrayed Leroy Jethro Gibbs since the show's first season. This season includes the 450th episode of the series.

Premise
NCIS revolves around a fictional team of special agents from the Naval Criminal Investigative Service, which conducts criminal investigations involving the United States Navy and Marine Corps. Based at the Washington Navy Yard in Washington, D.C., the NCIS team is led by Supervisory Special Agent Alden Parker, an ex-FBI Special Agent and a skilled investigator.

Cast and characters

Main
 Sean Murray as Timothy McGee, NCIS Senior Special Agent, second in command of MCRT
 Wilmer Valderrama as Nick Torres, NCIS Special Agent
 Katrina Law as Jessica Knight, NCIS Special Agent
 Brian Dietzen as Dr. Jimmy Palmer, Chief Medical Examiner for NCIS
 Diona Reasonover as Kasie Hines, Forensic Specialist for NCIS
 David McCallum as Dr. Donald "Ducky" Mallard, NCIS Historian and former Chief Medical Examiner
 Rocky Carroll as Leon Vance, NCIS Director
 Gary Cole as Alden Parker, Supervisory Special Agent (SSA) of the Major Case Response Team (MCRT) assigned to Washington's Navy Yard, former FBI Special Agent turned NCIS's agent

Notable Guests
 Joe Spano as Tobias Fornell, Private Detective and former FBI Senior Special Agent
 Teri Polo as Vivian Kolchak, Alden Parker’s ex-wife and DOD paranormal investigator
 Laura San Giacomo as Dr. Grace Confalone, psychotherapist
Carolyn Hennesy as Tara Flynn, the Secretary of the Navy
Patrick Labyorteaux as Olev Kozlov (previously appeared as Bud Roberts)
David Blue as Charlie Samuels
Lilan Bowden as Robin Knight, Jessica Knight's Sister
 Margo Harshman as Delilah Fielding-McGee, DoD Intelligence Analyst and McGee's wife
Gregg Binkley as Bob Stivers
Robert Picardo as Retired Marine Gunnery Sergeant Dale Harding
Rachel Ticotin as Joy Sullivan Aaronson,  Alden Parker's 1st love
Austin Cauldwell as Ryan Aaronson
 Zane Holtz as Dale Sawyer, NCIS Special Agent 
 Tania Raymonde as Chloe Marlene
 Francis Xavier McCarthy as Roman Parker, Alden Parker's father
Michael Patrick Thornton as Jeremy Brighton, author, podcaster, & online parenting coach for wheelchair users

Crossover

NCIS: Hawaiʻi 

 Vanessa Lachey as Jane Tennant, NCIS Special Agent in Charge
 Jason Antoon as Ernie Malik, NCIS cyber intelligence specialist
 Noah Mills as Jesse Boone, NCIS second-in-command

NCIS: Los Angeles 
 Chris O'Donnell as Grisha "G." Callen, NCIS Supervisory Special Agent 
 LL Cool J as Sam Hanna, NCIS Senior Field Agent, Second in Command

Episodes

Production

Development
On March 31, 2022, NCIS was renewed for a twentieth season, which premiered on September 19, 2022.

Ratings

References

2022 American television seasons
2023 American television seasons
NCIS 20